NGC 6642 is a globular cluster located 26,700 light-years from Earth, in the constellation Sagittarius. Many "blue stragglers" (stars which seemingly lag behind in their rate of aging) have been spotted in this globular, and it is known to be lacking in low-mass stars.

References

External links 
 

Globular clusters
6642
Sagittarius (constellation)